Jodie Wickens is a Canadian politician, who served in the Legislative Assembly of British Columbia as a British Columbia New Democratic Party MLA for the Coquitlam-Burke Mountain electoral district. She was elected on February 2, 2016 in a by-election, defeating BC Liberal Party candidate Joan Isaacs and Green Party of British Columbia candidate Joe Keithley with 46% of the vote. In the 2017 provincial election, she was narrowly defeated by Joan Isaacs, who received 87 more votes.

Prior to being elected, Wickens was executive director of the Autism Support Network.

Electoral record

References

British Columbia New Democratic Party MLAs
Living people
Women MLAs in British Columbia
1982 births
21st-century Canadian politicians
21st-century Canadian women politicians
People from Coquitlam